Façade is a series of poems by Edith Sitwell, best known as part of Façade – An Entertainment in which the poems are recited over an instrumental accompaniment by William Walton. The poems and the music exist in several versions.

Sitwell began to publish some of the Façade poems in 1918, in the literary magazine Wheels. In 1922 many of them were given an orchestral accompaniment by Walton, Sitwell's protégé. The "entertainment" was first performed in public on 12 June 1923 at the Aeolian Hall in London, and achieved both fame and notoriety for its unconventional form. Walton arranged two suites of his music for full orchestra. When Frederick Ashton made a ballet of Façade in 1931, Sitwell did not wish her poems to be part of it, and the orchestral arrangements were used.

After Sitwell's death, Walton published supplementary versions of Façade for speaker and small ensemble using numbers dropped between the premiere and the publication of the full score in 1951.

Versions
Façade exists in several strongly contrasted versions, principally:
Edith Sitwell's Façade and Other Poems, 1920–1935 – the published versions of those of the poems chosen by the author for her 1950 volume of collected verse.
The Sitwell-Walton Façade (1951) – the first, and definitive published version of the full score of the entertainment
Façade Revived (1977) – a set of eight poems and settings not included in the 1951 version, published by Walton to mark his 75th birthday
Façade II (1979) – a revised version of Façade Revived, with some numbers dropped and others added
Façade – the complete version, 1922–1928 – a  42-number CD set compiled and performed by Pamela Hunter (1993) restoring all the poems that Walton set, and nine that he did not set.
Walton's orchestral Façade Suites (1926 and 1938)
A table showing the various permutations can be seen here.

Sitwell's published Façade poems
It is sometimes said that the Façade verses are nonsense poetry, in the tradition of Edward Lear. But despite the experiments with sound and rhythm, there is meaning in Sitwell's poems. The literary scholar Jack Lindsay wrote, "The associations are often glancing and rapid in the extreme, but the total effect comes from a highly organized basis of sense." Other writers have detected personal references in the Façade poems. Christopher Palmer lists many references to Sitwell's unhappy childhood, from the kind Mariner Man (her father's valet who entertained her with seafaring stories) to the implacable Mrs Behemoth (her mother).

The Façade poems published by Sitwell in her 1950 collection, Façade and other Poems, 1920–1935 are:

The Drum
Clowns' Houses
Said King Pompey
The Bat
Lullaby for Jumbo
Trio for Two Cats and a Trombone
Madame Mouse trots
Four in the Morning
Black Mrs Behemoth
The Wind's Bastinado
En Famille
Country Dance
Mariner Man
The Octogenarian
Bells of Grey Crystal
When Cold December
Came the Great Popinjay
Fox Trot
Polka
Mazurka
Jodelling Song
Scotch Rhapsody
Waltz
Popular Song
By the Lake
The Avenue
Water Party
The Satyr in the Periwig
Dark Song
"I do like to be beside the Seaside"
Hornpipe
Something lies beyond the Scene
When Sir Beelzebub

The Sitwell-Walton Façade – An Entertainment
The "entertainment" Façade, in which Sitwell's poems are recited over an instrumental accompaniment by Walton, was first given privately in the Sitwell family's London house on 24 January 1922. The first public performance was given at the Aeolian Hall, London, on 12 June 1923. On both occasions, the author recited the verse and the composer conducted the ensemble.

Walton made changes to the instrumentation for the entertainment between its premiere and the publication of the first printed score nearly thirty years later, but in both 1922–23 and 1951 he scored for six players. The published score specifies flute (doubling piccolo), clarinet (doubling bass clarinet), alto saxophone, trumpet, percussion, and cello. Walton quotes a range of earlier composers in his score, from Rossini (the William Tell overture appears in the Swiss Jodelling Song) to George Grossmith (whose comic song, "See me dance the polka", is present throughout Walton's Polka).

In the Sitwell-Walton Façade there are three poems, "Through Gilded Trellises," "A Man from a far Country" (from Sitwell's The Sleeping Beauty), and "Tarantella" (never formally published by Sitwell), that do not feature in her published edition of Façade. As the performing version frequently recited in public and recorded for the gramophone by Sitwell included the Tarantella, it may be assumed that she did not require the musical version to adhere strictly to the text of the published poems.

The public premiere of the entertainment was a succès de scandale. The performance consisted of Sitwell's verses, which she recited through a megaphone protruding through a decorated screen, while Walton conducted an ensemble of six players in his accompanying music. The press was generally condemnatory. One contemporary headline read: "Drivel That They Paid to Hear". The Daily Express loathed the work, but admitted that it was naggingly memorable. The Manchester Guardian wrote of "relentless cacophony". The Observer condemned the verses and dismissed Walton's music as "harmless". In The Illustrated London News, Edward J. Dent was much more appreciative: "The audience was at first inclined to treat the whole thing as an absurd joke, but there is always a surprisingly serious element in Miss Sitwell's poetry and Mr Walton's music ... which soon induced the audience to listen with breathless attention." In The Sunday Times, Ernest Newman said of Walton, "as a musical joker he is a jewel of the first water". Among the audience were Evelyn Waugh, Virginia Woolf and Noël Coward. The last was so outraged by the avant-garde nature of Sitwell's verses and the staging, that he marched out ostentatiously during the performance. The players did not like the work: the clarinettist asked the composer, "Mr Walton, has a clarinet player ever done you an injury?" Nevertheless, the work soon became accepted, and within a decade Walton's music was used for the popular Façade ballet, choreographed by Frederick Ashton.

On 3 March 1930, the BBC made what it described as a "complete" broadcast of the work (18 poems) from the Central Hall, Westminster, produced by Edward Clark.  The speakers were Sitwell and Constant Lambert and the conductor was  Leslie Heward.

Walton revised the music continually between its first performance and the first publication of the full score in 1951. That definitive version of the Sitwell-Walton Façade consists of:

	Fanfare (Instrumental)
	Hornpipe
	En Famille
	Mariner Man
	Long Steel Grass (Trio for Two Cats and a Trombone)
	Through Gilded Trellises [from The Sleeping Beauty]
	Tango-Pasodoble (I do like to be beside the Seaside)
	Lullaby for Jumbo
	Black Mrs Behemoth
	Tarantella
	A Man from a far Country [from The Sleeping Beauty]
	By the Lake
	Country Dance
	Polka
	Four in the Morning
	Something lies beyond the Scene
	Waltz
	Swiss Jodelling Song
	Scotch Rhapsody
	Popular Song
	Fox Trot (Old Sir Faulk)
	When Sir Beelzebub.

Walton's later additions
In the 1970s, Walton released some further numbers, under the title Façade Revived, later revising, dropping and adding numbers, as Façade II.Façade Revived comprises:
Daphne
Came the Great Popinjay
The Last Gallop
The Octogenarian
March (Ratatatan)
The White Owl
Aubade – Jane, Jane
Said King Pompey
The work was premiered at the Plaisterers' Hall, London on 25 March 1977, with Richard Baker as reciter and the English Bach Festival Ensemble conducted by Charles Mackerras.Façade II comprises:
Came the Great Popinjay
Aubade – Jane, Jane
March (Ratatatan)
Madam Mouse Trots
The Octogenarian
Gardener Janus Catches a Naiad
Water Party
Said King Pompey
This version was premiered at the Aldeburgh Festival on 19 June 1979, with Sir Peter Pears as reciter and an ensemble conducted by Steuart Bedford.

Complete 1922–1928 version
When the most comprehensive edition of the Sitwell-Walton versions was released in 1993 (on a CD featuring the voice of the Façade specialist Pamela Hunter with the Melologos ensemble) the number of poems had risen to 42. Pamela Hunter recites all these poems on the 1993 CD, including the nine (indicated by an asterisk, below) for which there are no extant musical accompaniments.

	Madame Mouse trots
	The Octogenarian
	Aubade – Jane, Jane
	The Wind's Bastinado*
	Said King Pompey
	Lullaby for Jumbo
	Small Talk I
	Small Talk II*
	Rose Castles
	Hornpipe
	Trio for Two Cats and a Trombone (Long Steel Grass)
	When Sir Beelzebub.
	Switchback*
	Bank Holiday I*
	Bank Holiday II*
	Springing Jack*
	En Famille
	Mariner Man
	Came the Great Popinjay
	Ass-Face*
	The Last Gallop
	The White Owl
	Gardener Janus
	Mazurka – God Pluto is a Kindly Man*
	Trams*
	Scotch Rhapsody
	Fox Trot
	Four in the Morning
	Popular Song
	By the Lake
	Black Mrs Behemoth
	Waltz
	Jodelling Song
	Polka
	Daphne
	A Man from a far Country
	Country Dance
	March
	Through Gilded Trellises
	"I do like to be beside the Seaside" (Tango-Pasodoble)
	Tarantella
	Something lies beyond the Scene

After this recording was made in 1993, evidence of additional numbers that were included in the June 1923 performance of Façade came to light.  As noted by Stewart Craggs, a copy of the programme for this performance emerged which indicated that 28 poems by Sitwell were set by Walton, including four that were previously unknown, having been lost and forgotten in the intervening years: Clown Argheb's Song, Dark Song, Gone Dry and Serenade.  A detailed chronology of the various versions of Façade has been given by Stephen Lloyd, who notes that Serenade may have been a recited poem or a purely instrumental piece.

Three Songs
Walton set three selections from Façade as art-songs for soprano and piano (1932), to be sung with full voice rather than spoken rhythmically. These are:
 Daphne
 Through Gilded Trellises
 Old Sir Faulk

Façade Suites
The first of Walton's two Façade suites for full orchestra was published in 1926. Walton conducted the first performance. The suite consists of:
Polka
Waltz
Swiss Jodelling Song
Tango-Pasodoble
Tarantella Sevillana

The second suite was premiered in 1938, with John Barbirolli conducting the New York Philharmonic. It consists of:
Fanfare
Scotch Rhapsody
Country Dance
Noche Espagnole
Popular Song
Old Sir Faulk – Foxtrot

The orchestra for both comprises 2 flutes, piccolo, 2 oboes, cor anglais, 2 clarinets, 2 bassoons, 4 horns, 2 trumpets, trombone, tuba, timpani, 3 percussionists (side drum, cymbals, xylophone, tambourine, bass drum, triangle, glockenspiel, castanets, rattle), and strings. Constant Lambert made an arrangement of both suites for piano duet.

A third suite, arranged by Christopher Palmer, was published in 1992, consisting of:
Hornpipe
Daphne (Song)
March
Through Gilded Trellises
Water Party Waltz
The Wind's Tambourine

The orchestra comprises: 2 flutes (both doubling piccolo), 2 oboes (2nd doubling cor anglais), 2 clarinets (2nd doubling bass clarinet), alto saxophone, 2 bassoons, 2 horns, 2 trumpets, trombone, tuba, timpani, 4 percussionists (side drum, large ide drum, field drum, bass drum, bass drum with cymbal, drum kit, wood block, castanets, maracas, tambourine, triangle, cymbals, suspended cymbal, tam-tam, glockenspiel, xylophone), piano (doubling celesta), and strings

Façade balletsFaçade was first made into a ballet by Günter Hess for the German Chamber Dance Theatre in 1929. In 1931 Frederick Ashton created another ballet version. Both used the First Façade Suite. For Ashton's version the Scotch Rhapsody and Popular Song were added to the First Suite. Ashton later expanded the ballet to include the Country Dance, Noche Espagnole and the Foxtrot, Old Sir Faulk.

In 1972, to mark Walton's seventieth birthday, Ashton created a new ballet using the score of the "entertainment". It was premiered at the Aldeburgh Festival, with Peter Pears as the reciter.

Selected discography

Façade – An Entertainment
Sitwell-Walton version: Edith Sitwell, Peter Pears (reciters), English Opera Group Ensemble, Anthony Collins. Decca LXT2977 (1954)
Expanded Sitwell-Walton version: Pamela Hunter (reciter), Melologos Ensemble, Silveer van den Broeck. Discover DICD 920125 (1993)

Façade Suites
Orchestra of the Royal Opera House, Covent Garden, Anatole Fistoulari. RCA SB2039 (1959)
Bournemouth Symphony Orchestra, Andrew Litton. Decca 470 508-2DC4 (2002)
 Andrew West and Ronald Woodley (piano duet, arr. Lambert). SOMM CD 0614 (2020)

Three Songs from Façade
Kiri Te Kanawa, soprano, Richard Amner, accompanist, on the album A Portrait of Kiri Te Kanawa. CBS 74116 (1984)

Notes

References
 
 
 
 
 
 

External links
 'The Jazz Age', lecture and concert by Chamber Domaine given on 6 November 2007 at Gresham College, including Façade'' (available for audio and video download).
 Video – William Walton – Façade (an entertainment) (36:30).
 Video - Façade - An Entertainment - Excerpts / Recitations of Edith Sitwell's Poems (11:40)

Compositions by William Walton
English poems
1922 compositions
Compositions with a narrator
Art songs
Orchestral suites
1918 poems